Fear Factor: Unleashed is a Game Boy Advance game that is based on the reality series Fear Factor. Ports for PlayStation 2 and Xbox, were planned in the next year but later cancelled.

Details
The player is able to choose if they want their character to be a man or woman and what skin color they want the character to have. The character has four statistics which are nerve, steadiness, stomach, and stamina. The video game has 12 mini-games which are the gross-out stunts, the skill-type stunts, and the action stunts.

Reception

The game received "generally unfavorable reviews" according to video game review aggregator Metacritic.

David Beaudoin of 1UP.com said that the game's biggest flaw is that only fans will truly appreciate the title, and gave the game a D−. Ricky Tucker of Game Vortex said that the mini-games are fun especially on the Game Boy Advance. Chris Faylor of Gaming-Age said that he only recommends the game to die-hard fans of the show.

References

Action video games
Cancelled PlayStation 2 games
Game Boy Advance games
Game Boy Advance-only games
North America-exclusive video games
2004 video games
Video games developed in Canada
Video games based on game shows
DC Studios games
Single-player video games